Chrysoviridae is a family of double-stranded RNA viruses. Members of the family are called chrysoviruses.

Virology 

The capsid is about 35-40 nm in diameter. The genome has four segments (tetrapartite). These segments are separately encapsulated.

Taxonomy
The following genera are recognized:
 Alphachrysovirus
 Betachrysovirus

References

External links
 ICTV Report: Chrysoviridae

 
Virus families
Riboviria